James Brian Logue (born March 25, 1939) is an American former ice hockey goaltender, Olympian and coach.

Career 
After graduating from Boston College in 1961, Logue played with Team USA at the 1968 Winter Olympics held in Grenoble, France. He appeared in only one game, allowing 10 goals on 42 shots in 40 minutes against the gold medal-winning Soviet team.

Logue ended his playing days shortly thereafter and began his coaching career as an assistant with Merrimack. Logue worked off and on with the Warriors for nearly 20 years, helping the program win numerous championships, including the inaugural Division II tournament in 1978. During that time Logue also served as a coach for the US National Team and as the head coach for North Andover High School.

In 1988, Logue helped Merrimack become the first non D-I club make an appearance in the Division I tournament and even went so far as to win their first round match against Northeastern. Logue stepped down after the season but his retirement didn't last long as he was back behind the bench for Salem State three years later.

In 1993, Logue got an opportunity to return to his alma mater and became an assistant under Steve Cedorchuk. While Cedorchuk was replaced by Jerry York a year later, Logue remained in his position and helped rebuild the program into a national power. After being made an associate head coach, Logue worked with several highly-touted goaltending prospects including Scott Clemmensen, Cory Schneider and John Muse. In 2001, Logue was finally able to help the Eagles win a National Championship, ending a 52-year drought. Logue was also behind the bench for BC next three championships, won in 2008, '10 and '12. After 20 years with the Eagles, Logue announced his retirement in the summer of 2013.

Career statistics

Regular season and playoffs

International

References

External links

1939 births
Living people
Ice hockey players at the 1968 Winter Olympics
Olympic ice hockey players of the United States
Ice hockey players from Massachusetts
Boston College Eagles men's ice hockey players
People from Melrose, Massachusetts
Sportspeople from Middlesex County, Massachusetts
American men's ice hockey goaltenders